The Iványi originates in the Mátra range at nearly 470 metres above sea level, south of Mátraterenye, Nógrád County, Hungary. It is a left tributary of the Zagyva. The stream flows northward and reaches the Zagyva north of Mátramindszent.

The Tószeri flows into it not far from Mátraterenye.

Settlements on the banks

 Mátraterenye

Rivers of Hungary